Jim White (25 April 1922 – 25 May 2006) was an  Australian rules footballer who played with Hawthorn in the Victorian Football League (VFL).

Notes

External links 

1922 births
2006 deaths
Australian rules footballers from Victoria (Australia)
Hawthorn Football Club players